Bast Qalat (also Romanized as Bast Qalāt and Bast-e Qalāt; also known as Bast Ghalāt) is a village in Fatuyeh Rural District, in the Central District of Bastak County, Hormozgan Province, Iran. At the 2006 census, its population was 1,024, in 170 families.

References 

Populated places in Bastak County